In five-dimensional geometry, a rectified 5-simplex is a convex uniform 5-polytope, being a rectification of the regular 5-simplex.

There are three unique degrees of rectifications, including the zeroth, the 5-simplex itself. Vertices of the rectified 5-simplex are located at the edge-centers of the 5-simplex. Vertices of the birectified 5-simplex are located in the triangular face centers of the 5-simplex.

Rectified 5-simplex

In five-dimensional geometry, a rectified 5-simplex is a uniform 5-polytope with 15 vertices, 60 edges, 80 triangular faces, 45 cells (30 tetrahedral, and 15 octahedral), and 12 4-faces (6 5-cell and 6 rectified 5-cells).

E. L. Elte identified it in 1912 as a semiregular polytope, labeling it as S.

Alternate names 
 Rectified hexateron (Acronym: rix) (Jonathan Bowers)

Coordinates 

The vertices of the rectified 5-simplex can be more simply positioned on a hyperplane in 6-space as permutations of (0,0,0,0,1,1) or (0,0,1,1,1,1).  These construction can be seen as facets of the rectified 6-orthoplex or birectified 6-cube respectively.

As a configuration 
This configuration matrix represents the rectified 5-simplex. The rows and columns correspond to vertices, edges, faces, cells and 4-faces. The diagonal numbers say how many of each element occur in the whole rectified 5-simplex. The nondiagonal numbers say how many of the column's element occur in or at the row's element.

The diagonal f-vector numbers are derived through the Wythoff construction, dividing the full group order of a subgroup order by removing one mirror at a time.

Images

Related polytopes
The rectified 5-simplex,  031, is second in a dimensional series of uniform polytopes, expressed by Coxeter as 13k series. The fifth figure is a Euclidean honeycomb, 331, and the final is a noncompact hyperbolic honeycomb, 431. Each progressive uniform polytope is constructed from the previous as its vertex figure.

Birectified 5-simplex

The birectified 5-simplex is isotopic, with all 12 of its facets as rectified 5-cells. It has 20 vertices, 90 edges, 120 triangular faces, 60 cells (30 tetrahedral, and 30 octahedral). 

E. L. Elte identified it in 1912 as a semiregular polytope, labeling it as S.

It is seen in the vertex figure of the 6-dimensional 122, .

Alternate names 
 Birectified hexateron
 dodecateron (Acronym: dot) (For 12-facetted polyteron) (Jonathan Bowers)

Construction 
The elements of the regular polytopes can be expressed in a configuration matrix. Rows and columns reference vertices, edges, faces, and cells, with diagonal element their counts (f-vectors). The nondiagonal elements represent the number of row elements are incident to the column element.

The diagonal f-vector numbers are derived through the Wythoff construction, dividing the full group order of a subgroup order by removing one mirror at a time.

Images 

The A5 projection has an identical appearance to Metatron's Cube.

Intersection of two 5-simplices 

The birectified 5-simplex is the intersection of two regular 5-simplexes in dual configuration. The vertices of a birectification exist at the center of the faces of the original polytope(s). This intersection is analogous to the 3D stellated octahedron, seen as a compound of two regular tetrahedra and intersected in a central octahedron, while that is a first rectification where vertices are at the center of the original edges.

It is also the intersection of a 6-cube with the hyperplane that bisects the 6-cube's long diagonal orthogonally.  In this sense it is the 5-dimensional analog of the regular hexagon, octahedron, and bitruncated 5-cell.  This characterization yields simple coordinates for the vertices of a birectified 5-simplex in 6-space: the 20 distinct permutations of (1,1,1,−1,−1,−1).

The vertices of the birectified 5-simplex can also be positioned on a hyperplane in 6-space as permutations of (0,0,0,1,1,1).  This construction can be seen as facets of the birectified 6-orthoplex.

Related polytopes

k_22 polytopes 

The birectified 5-simplex, 022, is second in a dimensional series of uniform polytopes, expressed by Coxeter as k22 series. The birectified 5-simplex is the vertex figure for the third, the 122. The fourth figure is a Euclidean honeycomb, 222, and the final is a noncompact hyperbolic honeycomb, 322. Each progressive uniform polytope is constructed from the previous as its vertex figure.

Isotopics polytopes

Related uniform 5-polytopes 

This polytope is the vertex figure of the 6-demicube, and the edge figure of the uniform 231 polytope.

It is also one of 19 uniform polytera based on the [3,3,3,3] Coxeter group, all shown here in A5 Coxeter plane orthographic projections. (Vertices are colored by projection overlap order, red, orange, yellow, green, cyan, blue, purple having progressively more vertices)

References 

 H.S.M. Coxeter: 
 H.S.M. Coxeter, Regular Polytopes, 3rd Edition, Dover New York, 1973 
 Kaleidoscopes: Selected Writings of H.S.M. Coxeter, edited by F. Arthur Sherk, Peter McMullen, Anthony C. Thompson, Asia Ivic Weiss, Wiley-Interscience Publication, 1995,  
 (Paper 22) H.S.M. Coxeter, Regular and Semi Regular Polytopes I, [Math. Zeit. 46 (1940) 380-407, MR 2,10]
 (Paper 23) H.S.M. Coxeter, Regular and Semi-Regular Polytopes II, [Math. Zeit. 188 (1985) 559-591]
 (Paper 24) H.S.M. Coxeter, Regular and Semi-Regular Polytopes III, [Math. Zeit. 200 (1988) 3-45]
 Norman Johnson Uniform Polytopes, Manuscript (1991)
 N.W. Johnson: The Theory of Uniform Polytopes and Honeycombs, Ph.D. 
  o3x3o3o3o - rix, o3o3x3o3o - dot

External links 
 
 Polytopes of Various Dimensions, Jonathan Bowers
 Rectified uniform polytera (Rix), Jonathan Bowers
 Multi-dimensional Glossary

5-polytopes